Benge is an unincorporated community in Adams County, Washington. Benge School District serves the community, and downtown Benge contains Benge Elementary School.

At the 2000 census, the Benge ZIP code (99105) had a population of 57 people, with 33 housing units.  The median household income was $37,500.

History
The Mullan Military Road, started in 1859 by Lieutenant John Mullan, connected the upper navigable Missouri River with the Columbia River. This 624-mile road, which passed through what was later to become the town of Benge, was completed in 1862 at a cost of $280,000. The Benge section of the road was completed on May 22, 1861; the wagon ruts were still visible in 2008 just northeast of town at the site of the First Benge School. Although built as a military road, it was used by civilians for both travelers and cargo transport until the Northern Pacific Railroad was completed in 1883.

The town is named after Frank H. Benge, who represented Adams County in the State Legislature in 1904. Benge and his wife donated the land upon which the town site was platted on May 13, 1907.

Frank & Mary Crouch Benge and daughters came to Adams County in 1892. They had lived on the current site of Benge for 15 years when the Spokane, Portland and Seattle Railway surveyed the rail line to pass right through their ranch house. The Benges were paid $5,000 to move their house. They built an 11-room house with the rock excavated from a nearby rail cut. The house became a boarding house and served as a community center for a number of years.

References

Unincorporated communities in Adams County, Washington
Unincorporated communities in Washington (state)